Brent MacNab (January 15, 1931 – July 1, 2020) was a Canadian professional hockey player who played for the St. Louis Flyers, Syracuse Warriors and Springfield Indians in the American Hockey League. He also played for the Vancouver Canucks in the Western Hockey League, and the Springfield Indians, Chicoutimi Sagueneens, and Quebec Aces in the Quebec Hockey League.

External links
 
 Tribute Archive

1931 births
2020 deaths
Canadian ice hockey defencemen
Chicoutimi Saguenéens (QSHL) players
Ice hockey people from Alberta
People from the County of Vermilion River
Quebec Aces (QSHL) players
St. Louis Flyers players
Syracuse Warriors players
Springfield Indians players
Vancouver Canucks (WHL) players